Michael Coates is a former Australian rules footballer, who played for the Fitzroy Football Club in the Victorian Football League (VFL). He is the son of George Coates, an AFL Life Member and Fitzroy/Brisbane Lions Hall of Fame member. Michael was recruited to Fitzroy from Surrey Hills under the father-son rule. His first senior game was in 1982 (against Carlton) and played 29 senior games in total over the years 1982–1984, and 1986, after having briefly joined the Sydney Swans in 1985.

References

External links

Fitzroy Football Club players
1961 births
Living people
Australian rules footballers from Melbourne